Basht District is a district (bakhsh) in Basht County, Kohgiluyeh and Boyer-Ahmad Province, Iran. At the 2006 census, its population was 9,606, in 1,824 families. The district has no cities. It has one rural district (dehestan): Babuyi Rural District.

References 

Districts of Kohgiluyeh and Boyer-Ahmad Province
Basht County